Kim David Carpenter   is an Australian visual artist, theatre director, designer and devisor. For thirty years he was artistic director of his company, Kim Carpenter's Theatre of Image.

Early life 
Carpenter was born in Newcastle, New South Wales in 1950. He moved to Sydney as a teenager to train as a painter. He studied production at the National Institute of Dramatic Art in 1968 and 1969. He also studied at Motley Theatre Design Course in London in 1971.

Biography 

During the 1970s, Carpenter designed for the Melbourne Theatre Company and Sydney's Nimrod Theatre Company. He was, for a short period, co-Artistic Director of Nimrod in the early 1980s.

In 1988, Carpenter established Theatre of Image as Sydney's first visual theatre company. Theatre of Image has developed into a leading Australian theatre company for children and families, with its productions having a distinctive visual style. In September 2019 he announced the closure of the company.

His work includes The Book of Everything which he created with Neil Armfield for Theatre of Image and Belvoir. The production toured Australia and played a season in New York at the New Victory Theater.

In 2019 he adapted and designed The Happy Prince as a ballet for The Australian Ballet. It premiered at the Queensland Performing Arts Centre In February 2019

Carpenter was made a Member of the Order of Australia in 2013 for significant service to the performing arts.

Carpenter has devised, directed or designed over 100 productions for theatre, opera, dance, physical theatre, ballet and puppetry.

For Theatre of Image

References 

Australian theatre directors
Australian scenic designers
Australian costume designers
Living people
1950 births
Members of the Order of Australia